Banbridge railway station was on the Banbridge, Lisburn and Belfast Railway which ran from Knockmore Junction to Banbridge in Northern Ireland.

History

The station was opened on 1 August 1863.
The station was part of the once extensive Great Northern Railway (Ireland) system.

The station closed on 30 April 1956 by the Great Northern Railway Board.

References 

Disused railway stations in County Down
Railway stations opened in 1863
Railway stations closed in 1956
railway station
Railway stations in Northern Ireland opened in the 19th century